Proalidae is a family of rotifers belonging to the order Ploima.

Genera:
 Bryceella Remane, 1929
 Proales Gosse, 1886
 Proalinopsis Weber, 1918
 Wulfertia Donner, 1943

References

Ploima
Rotifer families